Mystaria is a genus of African crab spiders first described by Eugène Simon in 1895.

Species
 it contains fifteen species:
Mystaria budongo Lewis & Dippenaar-Schoeman, 2014 — Congo, Kenya, Rwanda, Uganda
Mystaria decorata (Lessert, 1919) — East Africa
Mystaria flavoguttata (Lawrence, 1952) — Congo, South Africa
Mystaria irmatrix Lewis & Dippenaar-Schoeman, 2014 — Mozambique, South Africa
Mystaria lata (Lawrence, 1927) — Namibia, South Africa
Mystaria lindaicapensis Lewis & Dippenaar-Schoeman, 2014 — South Africa
Mystaria mnyama Lewis & Dippenaar-Schoeman, 2014 — South Africa
Mystaria occidentalis (Millot, 1942) — Guinea, Cameroon, Congo, Mozambique, Rwanda, South Africa, Tanzania, Uganda
Mystaria oreadae Lewis & Dippenaar-Schoeman, 2014 — Rwanda, Congo
Mystaria rufolimbata Simon, 1895 — Sierra Leone, Cameroon, Ivory Coast, Congo, Gabon, Mozambique, South Africa
Mystaria savannensis Lewis & Dippenaar-Schoeman, 2014 — Zambia, Zimbabwe, Botswana, South Africa
Mystaria soleil Lewis & Dippenaar-Schoeman, 2014 — Uganda, Kenya
Mystaria stakesbyi Lewis & Dippenaar-Schoeman, 2014 — Congo, Liberia, Gabon, Ghana, Kenya, Rwanda, Tanzania, Uganda
Mystaria variabilis (Lessert, 1919) — Mozambique, South Africa, Tanzania, Congo, Ethiopia, Kenya, Malawi, Rwanda, Uganda
Mystaria v. delesserti (Caporiacco, 1949) — Kenya

References

External links

Araneomorphae genera
Thomisidae